Thonet is a surname. Notable people with the surname include:

 Anne Bonnet, née Thonet (1908–1960), Belgian painter
 Michael Thonet (1796–1871), German–Austrian cabinet maker
 Gebrüder Thonet, furniture manufacturer founded by Michael Thonet
 Thonet GmbH